Sébastien Roth (born 1 April 1978) is a Swiss former professional football goalkeeper

Club career 
Roth played mostly for Servette FC. After the bankruptcy of Servette, he played half a year for FC Lorient and then for Yverdon-Sport FC, CS Chênois and FC Schaffhausen

International career 
Roth was a last-minute injury replacement for Fabrice Borer at the 2004 UEFA European Championship, but has yet to play a match for the Switzerland national football team.

References

External links
profile at FC Schaffhausen website 
 Profile at Football.ch 
 

1978 births
Living people
Footballers from Geneva
Swiss men's footballers
Association football goalkeepers
Servette FC players
FC Schaffhausen players
FC Lorient players
Swiss Super League players
UEFA Euro 2004 players
SR Delémont players
FC Solothurn players
Yverdon-Sport FC players
CS Chênois players